Nakhon Sawan railway station is a railway station in Nong Pling Sub-district, Nakhon Sawan City, Nakhon Sawan. It is a Class 1 station and the main station in Nakhon Sawan Province. It is about 245 kilometres from Bangkok railway station. The railyard serves as a PTT Petroleum tanker car yard with a spur line to a gas refinery.

Train services
32 trains serve Nakhon Sawan railway station. All trains must stop at this station. They are the following:
 Rapid 107/112 Bangkok-Den Chai-Bangkok
 Express 51/52 Bangkok-Chiang Mai-Bangkok
 Local 407/408 Nakhon Sawan-Chiang Mai-Nakhon Sawan
 Local 401/402 Lop Buri-Phitsanulok-Lop Buri
 Rapid 111/108 Bangkok-Den Chai-Bangkok
 Special Express 9/10 Bangkok-Chiang Mai-Bangkok
 Special Express 3/4 Bangkok-Sawankhalok/Sila At-Bangkok
 Ordinary 201/202 Bangkok-Phitsanulok-Bangkok
 Rapid 109/102 Bangkok-Chiang Mai-Bangkok
 Ordinary 211/212 Bangkok-Taphan Hin-Bangkok
 Ordinary 207/208 Bangkok-Nakhon Sawan-Bangkok
 Special Express 13/14 Bangkok-Chiang Mai-Bangkok
 Rapid 105/106 Bangkok-Sila At-Bangkok

References
 
 
 
 

Railway stations in Thailand